Ceylonosticta mirifica is a species of damselfly in the family Platystictidae. It is endemic to Sri Lanka, found from primary forest on the road Uwella-Ratnapura area.

See also
 List of odonates of Sri Lanka

References

Damselflies of Sri Lanka
Insects described in 2016